Dale Edward Swapinski (born October 3, 1953) is an American politician in the state of Minnesota. He served in the Minnesota House of Representatives.

References

Democratic Party members of the Minnesota House of Representatives
1953 births
Living people
Politicians from Duluth, Minnesota
College of St. Scholastica alumni
Schoolteachers from Minnesota